The 2022–23 season is Alashkert's eleventh season in the Armenian Premier League and sixteenth overall.

Season events
On 27 June, Alashkert announced the signings of Bladimir Díaz from FAS and Fáider Burbano from Águila.

On 22 July, Alashkert announced the signing of Ronald Cuéllar from Nacional Potosí.

On 30 August. Alashkert announced that they had terminated their contracts with David Khurtsidze and Aleksandr Karapetyan by mutual consent.

On 9 September, Alashkert announced the signing of Sergei Ivanov from Zenit St.Petersburg.

On 13 September, Alashkert announced the signing of Narek Manukyan from Kaluga, whilst Kevin Reyes signed from FAS on 14 September, and Lucas Ventura joined from Malacateco on 15 September.

On 26 September, Alashkert announced the signing of free-agent Sergei Revyakin.

On 24 December, Alashkert announced that Vahe Gevorgyan had been appointed as their new Head Coach, and that they had released Tiago Cametá, James, Didier Kadio, Deou Dosa, Lucas Ventura, Wangu Gome, Béko Fofana, Sargis Metoyan, Benik Hovhannisyan, Karapet Manukyan, Bladimir Díaz, Kevin Reyes and Ronald Cuéllar.

On 5 January, Andranik Voskanyan left the club after his contract was terminated by mutual consent.

On 14 January, Alashkert announced the signing of Vitali Ustinov.

On 16 January, Alashkert loaned Wbeymar and Agdon from Ararat-Armenia for the remainder of the season.

On 18 January, Alashkert announced the signing of Daniel Carrillo from KuPS. The following day, 19 January, Alashkert announced the signing of Aram Kocharyan from Vitebsk.

On 21 January, Alashkert announced the return of Uroš Nenadović, with Yeison Racines signing from Lernayin Artsakh the following day.

On 24 January, Alashkert announced the signing of Karen Nalbandyan, who'd previously played for Noah.

On 27 January, Alashkert announced the signing of Timur Rudoselsky from Turan.

On 28 January, Alashkert announced the departure of Arman Meliksetyan, Sergei Revyakin, Rumyan Hovsepyan, Vahagn Ayvazyan and Fáider Burbano.

On 30 January, Alashkert announced the signings of Serob Grigoryan from BKMA Yerevan, and Arman Khachatryan who'd most recently played for Noah.

On 31 January, Alashkert announced the signing of Mateo Mužek from Kyzylzhar.

On 5 February, Alashkert announced the signing of Artur Miranyan who'd previously left Urartu in the summer of 2022.

On 12 February, Alashkert announced the signing of Roman Mysak who'd previously left Desna Chernihiv in the summer of 2022.

On 20 February, Alashkert announced the signing of Ivan Pešić who'd previously played for Caspiy.

Squad

Goal scorers

Clean sheets

Disciplinary record

References

FC Alashkert seasons
Alashkert
Alashkert